Edgcumbe is a hamlet  west of Penryn in Cornwall, England. Edgcumbe is situated on the A394 road from Helston to Penryn and is in the parish of Wendron (where the 2011 census population was included ).

References

Hamlets in Cornwall